Summer Hotel (Spanish: Hotel de verano) is a 1944 Mexican comedy film directed by René Cardona.

The film's sets were designed by Manuel Fontanals.

Cast
 Carlos Amador
 Blanquita Amaro 
 Ramón Armengod
 Eva Briseño
 Marcelo Chávez 
 Pedro Elviro 
 Camilo Farjat
 Consuelo Guerrero de Luna 
 Enrique Herrera 
 Rafael Icardo
 Janice Logan 
 Pepe Nava
 José Pulido
 Salvador Quiroz 
 Jorge Reyes 
 Alma Riva
 Germán Valdés 
 Pedro Vargas 
 Carlos Villarías

References

Bibliography 
 Maria Herrera-Sobek. Celebrating Latino Folklore: An Encyclopedia of Cultural Traditions. ABC-CLIO, 2012.

External links 
 

1944 films
1944 comedy films
Mexican comedy films
1940s Spanish-language films
Films directed by René Cardona
Mexican black-and-white films
1940s Mexican films